Ekeines kai Ego (Greek: Εκείνες και Εγώ) was a Greek television sitcom starring Yannis Bezos and Tasos Kostis. It is written by Bezos and Andreas Morfonios and directed by Morfonios. The series aired 1996, and lasted two seasons. It is one of Bezos' most popular sitcoms.

Title
The title means "Those and me". "Those" refers to the women surrounding the series' main character, a hopeless womanizer. It was based on Costas Pretederis' earlier hit series Ekeines kai Ego (1996), and featured Lambros Konstantaras in the role of Lambros Donganos, Antonis Yakovakis as his friend Dimitris Marikos and Rena Voutsina as Debora. The original series was directed by Dimitris Nikolaidis. Pretederis was also the writer for the 1996 version.

Main characters

Zahos Donganos
The protagonist of this series is Zahos Doganos (Yannis Bezos), a rich ladies' man whose interests revolve around women and partying hard. Although he has a fiancée, Eleni, this doesn't seem to affect his life. In fact, in every episode, he dates a different female, who in most cases, comes from his past. In a few episodes, we see him with huge lists of the names of women he has dated in the past. He lives with his housekeeper Debora (an African girl), who is also his protegee. Zahos is completely against marriage, in contrast with some of the other main characters of the show. He co-owns the "Doganos-Marikos" corporations along with his friend and associate Dimitris Marikos. One of their best clients is Iason Papapetrou, who gets tricked all the time by Zahos because of his affection for him. One of Zahos' most favorite places for entertainment is bouzoukia, where he goes with either ladies or his friends and relatives; actually, in most episodes, we see him sing too.

Dimitris Marikos
Marikos (Tasos Kostis) is Zaho's friend and associate. He is a workaholic. He always tries to advise Zahos, although Zahos never listens to him. He is often teased for his weight, either by Zahos or Lili (girlfriend of Petrakis, Zahos' nephew, and a secretary at "Donganos-Marikos" corporations). In most episodes, he appears to be single but often shows up with his girlfriend Mara. He always gets mad with Zahos, mostly because he never comes to the office, and generally about his way of life. However, it's obvious that sometimes he envies Zahos.

Deborah
Debora (Niki Sereti) (pronounced "Thevora") is Ζahos' housekeeper. She comes from Africa, and like all the other characters, she is teased a lot for her skin color. She lives with Zahos. Her main characteristic is that she pronounces  all words and names wrong; for example, she calls Zahos "Mr. Zahous", Eleni "Ilini," and Papapetrou "Papatreha". Debora has a boyfriend, Ksenofon (she calls him "Ksifounon"), who appears in a few episodes, but he doesn't like talking, so he almost never speaks. The writers tried to make fun out of that by showing him and Debora talking on the phone. Debora likes bouzoukia like Zahos and she listens to Sakis Rouvas and other Greek singers. She only knows how to make spinach pie (spanakopita; Greek: σπανακόπιτα), and she calls it "spakanopita" and everything else that can be made with spinach, something that often irritates Zahos.

Eleni
Eleni (Loukia Pistiola) is the long-time fiancé of Zahos, who loves him very much although she knows about his womanizing past and present. Sometimes, though, she becomes outrageous with the most severe "adulteries" of Zahos. She has been working as a secretary in "Doganos-Marikos" corporation although it is mentioned in the Christmas special episode  that she is financially strong and has a large dowry. In many cases, she collaborates with dimitris, Lilly, Petros, Deborah, and aunt Ortansia into tricking Zahos and playing severe jocks on him, related with the women of his life.

Lilly
Lilly (Valeria Kouroupi) is a young woman coming from a mother and a father that has been divorced and remarried several times each. She is irascible, audacious, and can manipulate her fiancé Petros and even dominate  him in various  ways, although in fact, she is fragile and loves him very much. She is constantly in war with Zahos because she shows no respect to him and makes fun of his behavior as a womanizer and narcissus, something that causes Zahos's rage, irony, and anger against her.

Aunt Ortansia Triovoulou
Ortansia (Nteniz Mpaltsavia in 1st season, Anna Paitatzi in the 2nd season) is the elderly sister of Zahos late mother. She tries to correct Zahos's behavior and is very fond of Eleni, working with her usually to help her reach wedding with Zachos. She has a phlegmatic and patient butler, Ioulios, who tolerates her old-styled and dominating behavior and seems to despise her, although in fact, he is very careful of her. She has money and a comfortable income but, she uses to hide her money for "future use" and lends money from Zahos all the time. Nevertheless, usually in her house, there is a shortage of food for her butler, who is forced to eat food sent to him by his relatives, having no other choice. In certain occasions,  she seems to have a light dementia  and is very strict and steep with people she considers illiterate and non-gentle. Zachos always talks ironically and negatively about her behind her back, but never dares to doubt her commands or wills.

External links

ANT1 original programming
1996 Greek television series debuts
1998 Greek television series endings
1990s Greek television series
Greek-language television shows
Greek comedy television series